Tim Hug (born 11 August 1987) is a Swiss Nordic combined skier who has been competing since 2003. At the 2010 Winter Olympics, he finished 9th in the 4 x 5 km team, 33rd in the 10 km individual large hill, and 35th in the individual normal hill events.

At the FIS Nordic World Ski Championships 2009 in Liberec, Hug finished 30th in the 10 km individual large hill, 39th in the 10 km mass start, and 41st in the 10 km individual normal hill events.

His best World Cup finish was ninth in the 4 x 5 team event at Germany in 2009 while his best individual finish was 11th in a 10 km individual large hill event at Italy in 2010.

References

1987 births
Living people
Olympic Nordic combined skiers of Switzerland
Nordic combined skiers at the 2010 Winter Olympics
Nordic combined skiers at the 2014 Winter Olympics
Nordic combined skiers at the 2018 Winter Olympics
Swiss male Nordic combined skiers
People from Solothurn
Sportspeople from the canton of Solothurn